New York’s 18th congressional district is a congressional district for the United States House of Representatives that contains the northern suburbs and exurbs of New York City. It is currently represented by Democrat Pat Ryan.

The 18th district includes all of Orange County, and most of Dutchess and Ulster Counties. The district includes the cities of Newburgh, Beacon, Kingston, and Poughkeepsie.

Voting 
Results Under Current Lines (Since 2023)

History
2023–Present:
All of Orange
Parts of Dutchess and Ulster
2013–2023: (map)
All of Orange and Putnam
Parts of Dutchess and Westchester
2003–2013:
Parts of Rockland, Westchester
1993–2003: 
Parts of Bronx, Queens, Westchester
1983–1993: 
Parts of Bronx
1913–1983:
Parts of Manhattan
1853–1873:
Montgomery

The 18th District was created in 1813.  For many years it was the upper Manhattan district. It was the east side Manhattan seat in the 1970s and then a Bronx district in the 1980s, Following the 1992 remap it became a Westchester-based district with narrow corridor through the Bronx and a large portion of central Queens. The 2002 remap gave those Queens areas to the 5th District and the 18th absorbed some Rockland areas due to the deconstruction of the old Orange-Rockland 20th District. In 2012, population lost in New York pushed the district further north, into the mid-Hudson Valley suburbs. From 2002 to 2013, the 18th district included most of Westchester County and part of Rockland County. It included Larchmont, Mamaroneck, New Rochelle, Ossining, the Town of Pelham, Scarsdale, Tarrytown, White Plains as well as most of New City and Yonkers.

The redrawn district is composed of the following percentages of voters of the 2003-2013 congressional districts: 1 percent from the 18th congressional district; 76 percent from the 19th congressional district; 2 percent from the 20th congressional district; and 21 percent from the 22nd congressional district.

In the August 23, 2022 Democratic Party primary Ulster County executive Pat Ryan defeated Aisha Mills and Moses Mugulusi. On the same date Ryan also defeated Dutchess County executive Marc Molinaro (Republican) in a special election to fill a vacant seat in the district. The latter contest was seen as a victory in a bellwether district. In the November 8, 2022 general election Ryan defeated New York State Assembly member Republican Colin Schmitt.

Republican Molinaro ran in the New York's 19th congressional district in the November general election and defeated Democrat Josh Riley.

Incumbent Sean Patrick Maloney changed his election district to the New York's 17th congressional district, after redistricting maps were announced.

List of members representing the district

Recent election results 
Note that in New York State electoral politics there are numerous minor parties at various points on the political spectrum. Certain parties will invariably endorse either the Republican or Democratic candidate for every office, hence the state electoral results contain both the party votes, and the final candidate votes (Listed as "Recap").

See also

List of United States congressional districts
New York's congressional districts
United States congressional delegations from New York

Notes

References

 Congressional Biographical Directory of the United States 1774–present
 2004 House election data Clerk of the House of Representatives
 2002 House election data "
 2000 House election data "
 1998 House election data "
 1996 House election data "

External links

Detailed Map of District

18
Constituencies established in 1813
1813 establishments in New York (state)